Sten Anders Ekberg (born 25 December 1964 in Täby, Sweden) is a former decathlon athlete who competed in the 1992 Summer Olympics for Sweden and was a Swedish decathlete National Record holder. Sten Ekberg won the Swedish Championship in both decathlon and heptathlon. Ekberg currently resides in the United States where he works as a chiropractor at his office Wellness For Life in Cumming, Georgia.

Education 
Ekberg attended Southern Methodist University Cox School of Business in Dallas, Texas. He competed in track and field at Southern Methodist where he still holds records.

Olympics and World Championships 
 Olympics: Barcelona 9th place, 1992 (8,136 points)
 Swedish National Decathlon Record: 1992 (8,246 points)
 National Championship Decathlon: Sweden 1st place, 1985, 1987, 1990, 1991, 1992
 National Championship Heptathlon: Sweden 1st place, 1989, 1993
 Seven Swedish National Gold Medals
 European Championships: 10th place, 1986
 NCAA Division I: Team Championship 1st place, 1986
 NCAA Division I: Decathlon 2nd place, 1986
 NCAA Division I: Decathlon 3rd place, 1985
 Southern Methodist University Records:	
100 Meter 1985	
400 Meter 1985	
1500 Meter 1985	
100 hurdles 1985	
Shot Put 1985	
Discus 1985	
Javelin 1985	
High Jump 1985	
Pole Vault 1985 (record still held)	
Long Jump 1985	
Decathlon Score 1985 (record still held)

See also 
 List of Swedish sportspeople
 List of decathlon national champions (men)
 List of Southern Methodist University people
 List of YouTubers

References 
 Olympic.org
 Swedish Olympic Committee / Sveriges Olympiska Kommitté
 Sports Reference / Olympic Sports
 
 Wikipedia / List of Decathlon National Championships (Men)

External links 
 Official website
  (YouTube - Dr. Sten Ekberg)

1964 births
Living people
People from Täby Municipality
Olympic athletes of Sweden
Athletes (track and field) at the 1992 Summer Olympics
Swedish decathletes
Swedish chiropractors
American chiropractors
Sportspeople from Stockholm County